Agostino Ernesto Castrillo (18 February 1904 – 16 October 1955) was an Italian Roman Catholic professed member of the Order of Friars Minor and the Bishop of San Marco Argentano Bisignano. Castrillo served as a pastor in Foggia during World War II and died of lung cancer not long following his 1953 appointment as a bishop.

The cause for sainthood commenced on 14 November 1984 in which he was granted the posthumous title of Servant of God. Pope Francis named him as Venerable on 16 June 2017.

Life

Agostino Ernesto Castrillo was born in 1904 in Caserta as the third of eleven children.

At the age of fifteen – in 1919 after World War I – he assumed the habit of the Order of Friars Minor in the order's Apulia and Molise province of Saint Michael the Archangel. He commenced his philosophical and theological studies for the priesthood, and upon the completion of those studies was ordained as a priest in Molfetta on 11 June 1927, in the Santuario della Madonna dei Martiri.

Castrillo was appointed as a parish priest in Foggia and was assigned to the parish of "Gesú e Maria" in 1936. He remained in that position during the Second World War and would be stationed there until 1946. During his time in Foggia he became the spiritual director of the Pontifical Athenaeum Antonianum in Rome and was later made the Provincial Minister of the Apulia-Molise province of the Franciscans. The onslaught of the Second World War saw him provide material and spiritual assistance to victims.

Pope Pius XII appointed him on 17 September 1953 as the Bishop of San Marco Argentano Bisignano and Castrillo received his episcopal consecration in his Foggia parish from the Servant of God Fortunato Maria Farina. However he suffered incurable lung cancer not long after that forced him to his bed for thirteen months; of his condition he said to friends: "Do not pity me: I am happy to suffer! This is my responsibility as a bishop: to pray and suffer".

Castrillo died in Cosenza on 16 October 1955 due to his lung cancer.

Beatification process
The beatification process commenced on 14 November 1984 – under Pope John Paul II – in which Castrillo was granted the posthumous title of Servant of God – the first official stage in the process. The ensuring diocesan process opened in 1995 and concluded its work in 1999 at which point the Congregation for the Causes of Saints validated the process in Rome in 2002.

The postulation sent the Positio to the C.C.S. in 2008 for the latter to commence their own investigation into the cause. Theologians advising them approved the cause on 27 October 2015. Pope Francis confirmed he lived a life of heroic virtue and named him as Venerable on 16 June 2017.

The current postulator assigned to the cause is Giovangiuseppe Califano.

References

External links
Hagiography Circle
Catholic Hierarchy

1904 births
1955 deaths
20th-century venerated Christians
20th-century Italian Roman Catholic bishops
Deaths from lung cancer
Friars Minor
People from Caserta
Venerated Catholics by Pope Francis
Deaths from lung cancer in Calabria